Kiddo is the second studio album by Swedish electropop singer Tove Styrke. It was released on 8 June 2015 by Sony Music. The album includes all five original songs from the EP Borderline.

Background
The title Kiddo is a direct reference to Beatrix Kiddo from the Kill Bill films. According to Styrke: "I like her character a lot — she's empowering and cool. Kill Bill was an influence from some of the songs [on the album], and especially in the beginning of the creative process of this album. I also have a love-hate relationship with the word "kiddo," it's something that people say in a demeaning manner. I felt if I took that word and used it almost as a superhero name, then I would take the power away from them and use it as a strength. That's the interesting part about language, you can use it to tell your own story. I like doing that when I write".

Reception

Spin rated Kiddo with 8 from 10 and named it "Album of the Week". Time reviewed the album favourably and called it "a Feminist Pop Triumph".

Accolades

Track listing

Notes
  signifies a co-producer

Personnel
Credits adapted from the CD liner notes of Kiddo.

 Tove Styrke – vocals
 Johan T Karlsson – production ; co-production 
 Tom Coyne – mastering
 Petter Eriksson – A&R
 Slobodan Zivic – art direction
 Carl Ask – production 
 Björn Hallberg – production 
 Christian Walz – production 
 Hedvig Jenning – photography

References

2015 albums
Tove Styrke albums